Seelyhoo were a Scottish folk band based in Edinburgh, with band members originally from Orkney, Isle of Lewis.

Seelyhoo were fronted by songwriter, vocalist and tin whistle player Fiona Mackenzie. Their music has been described as belonging to the traditional side of the progressive Celtic music movement, and Mackenzie's voice has been compared to that of Capercaillie's Karen Matheson. The band toured in Great Britain and continental Europe.

Seelyhoo's played traditional folk songs, as well as new songs written by Mackenzie, Jennifer Wrigley, Hazel Wrigley, and Sandy Brechin.

Discography
The First Caul (1995) Greentrax Recordings CDTRAX 102
Leetera (1998) Greentrax Recordings CDTRAX 160

Lineup
 Fiona Mackenzie (vocals, tin whistle)
 Sandy Brechin (accordion)
 Jennifer Wrigley (fiddle, hardanger fiddle)
 Jim Walker (percussion)
 Niall Muir (bass guitar, backing vocals)
 Hazel Wrigley (guitar, piano, fender rhodes, mandolin)
 Aaron Jones (bass guitar)

Reviews
 Musical Discoveries review

References

External links
Wrigley Sisters Biography
Traditional Scottish Music web page
Brechin All Records Website

Scottish folk music groups